Marco Antonio Hidalgo Zúñiga (born 13 September 1988) is a Chilean professional footballer who played as a defender. He joined Chilean Second Division side Deportes Recoleta in 2017.

Honours
Universidad de Concepción
 Primera B de Chile: 2013 Transición

References

External links
 
 

1988 births
Living people
Chilean footballers
Association football defenders
Unión La Calera footballers
Unión Española footballers
Chilean Primera División players